Miltiadès Papamiltiadès (Amfikleia, 1910 – 1987) was a Greek anatomist known for his studies of the lymphatic system. He was among the passengers of RMS Mataroa in 1945, fleeing from Greece to France among with many Greek intellectuals to escape the White Terror.

References

1910 births
1987 deaths
Greek anatomists
People from Phthiotis